Ascarina lucida, commonly known as hutu is a species of small tree in the family Chloranthaceae. It is endemic to New Zealand, being common on the West Coast and Nelson regions of the South Island and more rarely found in the North Island. A typical plant association is within the Westland podocarp/broadleaf forests with common understory associates of Blechnum discolor, Pseudowintera colorata, Pseudopanax colensoi and Coprosma lucida. Most genus members are dioecious, producing unisexual male or female flowers on separate plants. Ascarina lucida, the only member of its genus to occur in New Zealand, is monoecious. It will grow to a height of 6m and can have a 30 cm trunk. The leaves which are in opposite pairs are simple, yellowish green in color, have a raised mid rib and are very similar to Laurelia novae-zelandiae. Their margins have prominent teeth which are dark colored at the tips. Ascarina lucida is now nearly extinct in the Taranaki region but was last reported in Oct 1969 at Mt Taranaki, near Pukeiti by Colin Ogle.

Tolerance
The distribution of Ascarina lucida suggests an inability to survive severe frosts or droughts. Its environmental tolerance to climatic extremes was experimentally tested by exposing the seedlings to frost, drought, and waterlogged soil conditions. Ascarina lucida has a similar drought tolerance to Coprosma grandifolia, a species known to be drought intolerant; seedlings had considerable tolerance of waterlogged soils, but exhibited reduced root weights when severely waterlogged; and a frost of -2 °C resulted in complete mortality for seedlings sourced from lowland and sub montane populations. Abundance of Ascarina lucia in a place can partially own to a warm, wet climate. However, the early successional nature of this species also suggests that disturbance regime plays an important role in regulating its distribution and abundance.

References
 C. Michael Hogan. 2009. Crown Fern: Blechnum discolor, Globaltwitcher.com, ed. N. Stromberg
 Lucy B. Moore. 1977. The flowers of "Ascarina lucida" Hook. f. (Chloranthaceae), New Zealand Journal of Botany, volume 15, pages 491–494
 T.E.R:R.A.I.N. 2008–2015.  
 Timothy J. Martin, John Ogden. 2005.

Line notes

Chloranthaceae
Trees of New Zealand
Endemic flora of New Zealand
Taxa named by Joseph Dalton Hooker